Muwaffaq Salti Air Base - Azraq is a Royal Jordanian Air Force air base located in Azraq, Zarqa Governorate.

History

In 1918, during World War I, T.E. Lawrence (also known as Lawrence of Arabia) used the historic castle in Azraq and the plains at that site as a base for use as a landing ground for the aircraft which were supporting the column pushing north towards Syria. The main qualities of the area were its good visibility and fine weather for flying.

In 1976, the area was chosen by the Royal Jordanian Air Force for a major new air base. Construction started that same year and in November, 1980, No 1 (Northrop F-5A/B Freedom Fighters) and No 11 squadrons (F-5E/F Tiger II's) were deployed there.

The air base was officially opened on May 24, 1981. It was named after Lieutenant Muwaffaq Salti who died in battle with the Israeli Air Force on November 13, 1966, during the Battle of Samou. It was initially home to Nos 1 and 25 Mirage squadrons. Between 1997 and 2007 Mirage squadrons were based here.

Between October 2014 and July 2015 the Belgian Air Component deployed six Lockheed Martin F-16AM Fighting Falcon's here as well under Operation Desert Falcon (later Operation Inherent Resolve) due to the military intervention against the Islamic State of Iraq and the Levant.

In 2019 the United States began a $143 million expansion of the airbase. The expansion includes a new airlift apron, a personnel recovery and special operations forces apron, and a close air support (CAS) and intelligence, surveillance, and reconnaissance (ISR) apron as well as a cargo marshaling yard.

In April 2020, the U.S. Army Corps of Engineers Middle East District contracted American International Contractors to build infrastructure on the Air Base, including aprons and taxiways, a marshaling yard facility, and support facilities and utilities. Beginning in November 2021, the United States began upgrading the airbase to turn it into a more permanent base with the US Army Corps of Engineers released the solicitation to find a contractor to build a new air traffic control tower.

Current use

Since 1997 No's 1, 2 and 6 (General Dynamics F-16 Fighting Falcon) squadrons have been based there.

The American Government along with other countries has deployed various aircraft there due to the military intervention against ISIL. The base is reported to host several MQ-9 Reaper drones, based on satellite imagery. The base is partly operated by the 407th Air Expeditionary Group.

Units
 1st Fighter Squadron - F-16AM/BM MLU M2
The 1st Squadron was formed in 1958 with Hawker Hunters and later equipped with F-5s then the Mirage F1 and now F-16 Fighting Falcon, which has become RJAF's primary fighter, operating with the 1st, 2nd and 6th Squadrons since 1997.

The squadron’s role has changed over the years from air to ground, air to air and reconnaissance to air defense and air to ground, but is now, along with the other F-16 squadrons, the main striking force of RJAF. The 1st Squadron was the first fighter squadron and has a rich history. It participated in all the conflicts and engaged in every air battle that Jordan has fought since the squadron was formed in 1958.
 2nd Fighter Squadron - F-16AM/BM MLU M6.5
The 2nd Squadron was first formed in 1958 with de Havilland Vampires then with Hunters and later in 1974 with F5As and Bs as an advanced training squadron at King Hussein Air Base, Mafraq. It subsequently flew from Amman and Mafraq as a fighter squadron, then flew again from Mafraq, renamed in 1978 as the King Hussein Air College, with the CASA C-101 as the advanced jet trainer. It is now equipped with the F-16.

The 2nd Squadron has a dual job: training newly graduate pilots on F-16s and supporting the 1st Squadron operations as required.
The training, which is basically a tactical conversion course, extends over 8 months, during which pilots count 76 flights, averaging 85.7 hours.
 6th Fighter Squadron - F-16AM/BM MLU M3
The 6th Squadron is identical to the 1st Squadron in mission and equipment.

See also
 H-4 Air Base

References

External links

Airports in Jordan
Military installations of Jordan
Military installations of the United States in Jordan
Military installations established in 1976